HNK Vukovar 1991 is a professional Croatian football club based in Vukovar, a city in Slavonia region. They were re-founded in 2012, and they currently play in the Croatian First Football League, the second level of Croatian football.

History

The club was founded on the same day in early February 2012 when the old club Vukovar '91, who played 1 season in Croatia's top division, was dissolved due to bankruptcy.

New club's first season in fourth-tier competition was successful, as they got promoted to the 3. HNL, third-tier competition. They remained there until 2022-23 season, when they got promoted to First football league, second-tier competition.

Recent seasons

Current squad

References

Association football clubs established in 2012
Football clubs in Croatia
2012 establishments in Croatia
Vukovar